Rumburak lateripunctatus is a jumping spider species that lives in South Africa. It is the type species of the genus Rumburak.

References

Endemic fauna of South Africa
Salticidae
Spiders of South Africa
Spiders described in 2014